Highland High School is a public high school located in Highland, Illinois. HHS is in the southeast corner of Madison County and is part of Highland Community Unit School District 5.

History 
The 1600 block of Lindenthal Avenue housed Highland High School classes beginning in the Fall of 1935. The building was built in part to the National Recovery Act and need for a new public school. The building features a central unit gymnasium with high school classes on the left and grade school on the right. The gymnasium was not only used for athletics, but for community events. 

In 1974 it was determined that the Lindenthal campus was no longer a viable location for HHS and the Capitol Development Board offered a grant to the Highland Community School District. On June 1, voters passed a bond issue accepting the grant. Highland High School would begin classes on Troxler Avenue starting in the Fall of 1976.

References

External links

Public high schools in Illinois
Schools in Madison County, Illinois